Rufo may refer to:

 Rufo (given name)
 Rufo (surname)
 San Rufo, village and comune in southern Italy
 RUFO - Rights Upon Future Offers